Abraham Calovius (also Abraham Calov or Abraham Kalau; 16 April 161225 February 1686) was a Lutheran theologian, and was one of the champions of Lutheran orthodoxy in the 17th century.

Biography

He was born in Mohrungen (Morąg), Ducal Prussia, a fief of Crown of Poland. After studying at Königsberg, in 1650 he was appointed professor of theology at Wittenberg, where he afterwards became general superintendent and primarius.

Calovius opposed the Catholics, Calvinists and Socinians, and in particular attacked the syncretism of his bitter enemy, George Calixtus. While Calixtus affirmed that the Apostles' Creed was an adequate definition of faith, Calovius rather held that one must believe every part of revealed truth in order to gain salvation. This led Calovius to deny as a heresy the idea that Roman Catholics or Calvinists could be partakers of salvation.

As a writer of polemics Calovius had few equals. His chief dogmatic work, Systema Iocorum theologicorum, (12 volumes, 1655–1677) represents the climax of Lutheran scholasticism. He produced a popular commentary on Martin Luther's translation of the Bible, "die deutsche Bibel," today known as the Calov Bible. He also wrote a much larger professional exegetical work on the entire Bible called "Biblia Illustrata." It is written from the point of view of a very strict belief in inspiration, his object being to refute the statements made by Hugo Grotius in his Commentaries.

Calovius died in Wittenberg.

Works (selection)

 Tractatus Novus De Methodo Docendi & Disputandi, 1632.
 Metaphysica divina. Rostock, Hallervord, 1640. 
 Scripta philosophica. Lübeck, Wilden, 1651.
 Systema locorum theologicorum.  Wittenberg 1655–1677 (12 volumes).
 Biblia illustrata. Frankfurt am Main 1672–1676 and 1719 (4 volumes).
 Theologia positiva. Wittenberg 1682.

Notes

References
 Marco Sgarbi, Abraham Calov and Immanuel Kant. Aristotelian and Scholastic Traces in the Kantian Philosophy, Historia Philosophica, 8, 2010, pp. 55–62

External links

  Abraham Calov, Scripta philosophica
 Abraham Calov (1612-1686) Post-Reformation Digital Library 
 The Birth of Ontology. A selection of Ontologists from 1560 to 1770
 Abraham Calov's Doctrine of Vocatio in Its Systematic Context by Kenneth Appold
 Dogmatic excerpts from Syncretismus and Digressio by Abraham Calov
 Lutheran Orthodoxy under Fire by Timothy Schmeling

1612 births
1686 deaths
People from Morąg
People from the Duchy of Prussia
17th-century German Lutheran clergy
German Lutheran theologians
German male non-fiction writers
17th-century German Protestant theologians
17th-century Latin-language writers
17th-century German writers
17th-century German male writers
University of Königsberg alumni
Academic staff of the University of Wittenberg
17th-century Lutheran theologians